The Infiltrator is a 2016 American biographical crime film directed by Brad Furman and written by his mother Ellen Brown Furman. The film is based on the eponymous autobiography by Robert Mazur, a U.S. Customs special agent, who in the 1980s helped bust Pablo Escobar's money-laundering organization by going undercover as a corrupt businessman. The film stars Bryan Cranston as Mazur, with Diane Kruger, Benjamin Bratt, John Leguizamo, Saïd Taghmaoui, Joe Gilgun  and Amy Ryan in supporting roles. 

Filming began on February 23, 2015, in London. Both Mazur and Cranston received executive producer credits. The film premiered at the Tampa Theatre on July 6, 2016 and was released the following week in theaters. The film received a generally positive response from critics, but a poor response from audiences, as it grossed $22 million against a budget of between $28 and $47 million.

Plot

During the 1980s, U.S. Customs Service special agent Robert Mazur uses his undercover alias "Bob Musella" to become a pivotal player for drug lords laundering their dirty cash. Later, he infiltrates the world's largest cartel, and helps expose the money-laundering organization of drug lord Pablo Escobar and take down the Bank of Credit and Commerce International (BCCI), which had secretly taken illegal ownership of First American Bankshares in Washington, D.C.

Cast
 Bryan Cranston as US Customs Special Agent Robert Mazur / Bob Musella
 Diane Kruger as Kathy Ertz
 John Leguizamo as Emir Abreu
 Benjamin Bratt as Roberto Alcaino
 Amy Ryan as Bonni Tischler
 Jason Isaacs as Mark Jackowski
 Joe Gilgun as Dominic
 Daniel Mays as Frankie
 Yul Vazquez as Javier Ospina
 Simón Andreu as Gonzalo Mora Sr.
 Rubén Ochandiano as Gonzalo Mora Jr.
 Juliet Aubrey as Evelyn Mazur
 Olympia Dukakis as Aunt Vicky
 Saïd Taghmaoui as Amjad Awan
 Tom Vaughan-Lawlor as Steve Cook
 Elena Anaya as Gloria Alcaino
 Dinita Gohil as Farhana Awan
 Carsten Hayes as Rudy Armbrecht
 Juan Cely as The Informant
 Andy Beckwith as Joe
 Michael Paré as Barry Seal
 Mark Holden as Eric Wellman

Production 
The project was first announced by The Hollywood Reporter on October 8, 2014, with Brad Furman as director and Bryan Cranston as Robert Mazur; Miriam Segal produced the film for her Good Films banner along with George Films. Relativity International was announced to sell the film to foreign distributors at the American Film Market. On February 13, 2015, Diane Kruger was chosen to star for the unspecified female lead role. Benjamin Bratt was selected to star in the film as Roberto Alcaino, the agent's contact who dealt directly with cartel board members, including Escobar. On March 10, 2015, additional cast members were chosen, including John Leguizamo, Amy Ryan, Olympia Dukakis, Elena Anaya, and Juliet Aubrey. Broad Green Pictures acquired the US rights to the film on May 21, 2015.

Cranston and Leguizamo previously worked together in The Lincoln Lawyer, which Furman directed.

Filming 
Filming was previously set to begin in March 2015 in Tampa, Florida, but then moved to London and Paris. According to SSN Insider, filming began on February 23, 2015. On March 11, 2015, the studio confirmed that filming was underway in London and released a first-look image from the film.

The production moved to Florida at the end of April; filming began in Tampa on April 22, 2015, on location at Port Tampa Bay. On April 28, 2015, they filmed in Parkland Estates, near the former home of Santo Trafficante, an infamous Tampa mob boss.

Reception

Box office 
In the United States and Canada, The Infiltrator opened on Wednesday, July 13, 2016, and was projected to gross $5–8 million from 1,600 theaters in its opening five days. The film grossed $773,761 on its first day and $5.3 million in its opening weekend (a five-day total of $6.7 million), finishing eighth at the box office.

Critical response 
, the film holds a 72% approval rating on Rotten Tomatoes based on 179 reviews and an average rating of 6.4/10. The website's critical consensus reads, "The Infiltrators compelling fact-based story and tremendously talented cast are often just enough to balance out its derivative narrative and occasionally clunky execution." On Metacritic, the film has a score of 66 out of 100, based on 38 critics, indicating "generally favorable reviews". Audiences polled by CinemaScore gave the film an average grade of "A−" on an A+ to F scale.

Lawsuit
In 2016, Javier Ospina Baraya sued Robert Mazur and the makers of the film for what he alleged was an erroneous impression given of him. In 2019 the Florida State Appeals Court ruled the suit could proceed.

See also 
 CIA involvement in Contra cocaine trafficking
 Drug barons of Colombia
 War on drugs

References

External links 
 
 
 

2016 films
2010s biographical films
2016 crime drama films
2016 crime thriller films
American biographical films
American crime drama films
American crime thriller films
Films directed by Brad Furman
Broad Green Pictures films
Films shot in London
Films shot in Florida
Films set in the 1980s
Crime films based on actual events
Drama films based on actual events
Films about organized crime in the United States
Biographical films about drug traffickers
Films about Pablo Escobar
Films based on biographies
Biographical films about criminals
Biographical films about gangsters
Films about Colombian drug cartels
Films shot at Pinewood Studios
2010s English-language films
2010s American films